Fight the Tide is the second studio album from Christian rock band Sanctus Real, and was released on June 15, 2004 under Sparrow Records. Most of the album was written within one month and recorded in only four weeks. According to band members, the tight schedule caused them to refine the album's various musical and lyrical elements.

Fight the Tide won a GMA Dove Award for Modern Rock Album of the Year in 2005 and was generally well received by music critics. It also spawned the singles "Everything About You" and "The Fight Song", both of which hit #1 on Christian rock radio charts.

Background

In July 2003, before the band had prepared songs for Fight the Tide, lead vocalist Matt Hammitt said of the album: "[On Say it Loud] we wrote about every day life or about God but didn't open ourselves up completely and weren't vulnerable to listeners. I hope on the next album we really open up and pour it out."

In February 2004, Sanctus Real returned to the studio to record their second album, and nearly all of the tracks were written in the previous month. They only had four weeks to track and record the album in studio, and according to band members, recording sessions were very intensive and tiring. Hammitt said, "If we weren't in the studio laying down tracks, we were at home working on lyrics, melodies, and rewrites. It really felt like a 24 hour-a-day job for about four weeks." He estimated that two months would have been an ideal amount of time to record the album, but that the experience "was cool and it stretched us". Due to the constant guitar playing, especially during the second half of their recording time, guitarist Chris Rohman tried putting nail polish on his fingertips because they felt so raw.

Tedd T served as producer for Fight the Tide; it was recorded and mixed at Antenna Studios in Brentwood, Tennessee.

Lyrical themes
There are several themes on Fight the Tide, although its lyrics are mainly centered around various aspects of the Christian faith.  Lead vocalist Matt Hammitt noted how some of the tracks were based on the Biblical epistle of James, such as "Deeds", which discusses the idea that faith and works are not separable, and "The Fight Song", which references James' concept about the influence of "the tongue". Interpersonal relationships are another common topic. Hammitt and bassist Steve Goodrum wrote "The Fight Song" together, which was about a conflict between Goodrum and a friend: "I was kind of hurt, but I'm still close to that person ... The song is about fighting over small, unimportant things—the things that divide churches, marriages, and close relationships." "Alone" is a love song while "Change Me" is written as a prayer asking for better patience and kindness with others; the latter was written after Hammitt once "lost patience" with his wife: "I felt like less of a person at that point. That hurt me as well as it hurt her, because I said some stupid things when I was angry."

Promotion and release
In September 2004, Sanctus Real embarked on their first headlining tour, the Fight the Tide Tour. The tour covered over 25 cities and featured guest bands Hawk Nelson, Seven Places and Ever Stays Red.

The album's lead single, "Everything About You" was released to radios around the same time of the album's release. The song eventually reached #1 on R&R magazine's Christian rock chart in September, and held the position for six consecutive weeks.

Accolades
On 2005, the album won a Dove Award for Modern Rock Album of the Year at the 36th GMA Dove Awards. The song "Everything About You" was also nominated for Rock Recorded Song of the Year.

Track listing

Note
"Say Goodbye" includes 5 minutes of silence.

Personnel 
Sanctus Real
 Matt Hammitt – lead and backing vocals, guitars
 Chris Rohman – guitars
 Steve Goodrum – bass, backing vocals
 Mark Graalman – drums

Production 
 Christopher York – executive production
 Tedd T. – producer, overdub recording, mixing
 Allen Salmon – track recording
 Damon Riley – overdub recording
 Rusty Varenkamp – overdub recording
 Richard Dodd – mastering
 Jan Cook – creative direction
 Benji Peck – art direction, design, illustration
 Kristen Barlowe – photography
 Keith Shackleford and Commonrock Entertainment – management

Charts
Album
Billboard's Hot Christian Albums – #23
Billboards Top Heatseekers – #38Singles'''
"Everything About You" – #1 on R&R magazine's Christian rock chart
"The Fight Song" – #1 on R&R'' magazine's Christian rock chart

References

2004 albums
Sanctus Real albums
Sparrow Records albums